Toarlyn Lavon Fitzpatrick (born September 4, 1989), nicknamed Fitz, is an American professional basketball player currently playing for BCM U Pitesti of the Romanian first division.

High school career
Fitzpatrick played high school basketball at C. Leon King High School in Tampa, Florida.

College career
After high school, Fitzpatrick played college basketball at South Florida University, with the South Florida Bulls, from 2009 to 2013.

College statistics

|-
| style="text-align:left;"| 2009–10
| style="text-align:left;"| South Florida
|33 ||22 || 22.1 ||.398 ||.300 || .552 ||4.48  ||0.36 || 0.61 ||0.97 ||4.27
|-
| style="text-align:left;"| 2010–11
| style="text-align:left;"| South Florida
|33 || 6 || 14.2 ||.422 || .344 ||.733|| 4.09 ||0.52 || 0.39 || 0.55 || 4.30
|-
| style="text-align:left;"| 2011–12
| style="text-align:left;"|South Florida
|35 || 11 || 25.5 ||.443 ||.412 ||.688||6.43 ||0.89 || 0.71 || 1.00 || 7.97
|-
| style="text-align:left;"| 2012–13 
| style="text-align:left;"| South Florida
| 31 || 31 || 34.4 || .375 || .320 || .700|| 5.26 || 0.94|| 0.81 || 0.87 || 9.90
|-
|- class="sortbottom"
! style="text-align:center;" colspan=2|  Career

!132 ||70 || 23.9 ||.406 || .351 ||.660 || 5.08 ||0.67 || 0.63 ||0.85 ||6.58
|-

Professional career
Fitzpatrick began his pro career in the 2013–14 season in Belgium, with the Belgian League club Kangoeroes Willebroek. He moved to Greece for the 2014–15 season, to play in the Greek League with Apollon Patras.

He then moved to Germany for the 2015–16 season, to play with the German League club Walter Tigers.

On May 27, 2016, Fitzpatrick returned to Greece and signed a 1+1 year deal with Rethymno Cretan Kings.
 
On July 31, 2017, he signed with Akita Northern Happinets of the Japanese B.League, $60,000 buyout to Rethymno Cretan Kings. In 2018 he moved to the Cyberdyne Ibaraki Robots.

On July 19, 2018, Fitzpatrick returned to Greece once more, this time for Holargos, where he eventually became the team captain.

On July 25, 2019, he signed with ESSM Le Portel of the French LNB Pro A. 

On November 21, 2019, Fitzpatrick returned to Greece for Aris.

On September 9, 2020, Fitzpatrick signed with Ionikos Nikaias, his fifth club in Greece. On January 11, 2021, Fitzpatrick amicably parted ways with the Greek club, pending a better financial offer from abroad.

On January 12, 2021, Fitzpatrick signed with BCM U Pitești.

The Basketball Tournament
In 2017, Fitzpatrick competed in The Basketball Tournament with the Tampa Bulls, a team made up of USF alumni. Fitzpatrick's team made it to the Sweet 16 where they were eliminated by eventual champions Overseas Elite.

Personal life
In July 2018, Toarlyn Fitzpatrick married Greek volleyball player, Stella Tselidis. Their divorce was finalized in January 2021.

Fitzpatrick has a son from a previous relationship.

Career statistics

Regular season

|-
| align="left" | 2013–14
| align="left" | Willebroek
|36 ||15 || 16.6 ||.447 || .344 ||.655 || 4.14 || 0.75 ||0.36 ||0.19 ||7.75
|-
| align="left" | 2014–15
| align="left" |Patras
|26 ||23 || 27.0 ||.397 || .333 ||.659 || 7.31 || 1.15 ||0.92 ||1.12 ||11.12
|-
| align="left" | 2015–16
| align="left" |Tübingen
|34 ||14 || 22.5 ||.441 || .328 ||.674 || 4.26 || 1.03 ||0.71 ||0.44 ||8.59
|-
| align="left" | 2016–17
| align="left" |Rethymno
|31 ||26 || 27.9 ||.440 || .377 ||.672 || 6.74 || 2.03 ||0.81 ||0.90 ||12.16
|-
| align="left" | 2017–18
| align="left" | Akita
|24 ||7 || 21.7 ||.378 || .258 ||.703 || 6.2 || 2.6 || 1.6 ||0.5 ||10.3
|-
| align="left" | 2017–18
| align="left" | Ibaraki
|30 ||3 || 18.4 ||.406 || .280 ||.526 || 7.3 ||1.9 || 0.4 ||0.6 || 8.0
|-
| align="left" | 2018–19
| align="left" | Holargos
|29 ||27 || 27.4 ||.368 || .317 ||.533 || 5.10 ||1.17 || 0.90 ||0.24 || 8.24
|-
| align="left" | 2019–20
| align="left" | Le Portel
|8 ||3 || 13.2 ||.370 || .412 ||.000 || 2.25 ||1.25 || 0.38 ||0.12 || 3.38
|-

Playoffs 

|-
|style="text-align:left;"|2016–17
|style="text-align:left;"|Rethymno
| 5 ||  || 29.0 || .315 || .273 || .545 || 7.2 || 1.4 || 1.2 || 0.8 || 9.8
|-
|style="text-align:left;"|2018–19
|style="text-align:left;"|	Holargos
| 3 ||  || 31.7 || .424 || .400 || .500 || 13.3 || 0.3 || 1.0 || 0.0 || 12.0
|-

Early cup games 

|-
|style="text-align:left;"|2017
|style="text-align:left;"|Akita
|2 ||0 || 21:22 || .471 || .333 || .000 || 4.0 || 4.0 || 1.5 || 0.0 || 9.0
|-

References

External links
FIBA Game Center Profile
Eurobasket.com Profile
Draftexpress.com Profile
RealGM.com Profile
German League Profile 
Greek Basket League Profile 
South Florida Bulls bio
NCAA College Stats
 Twitter Account

1989 births
Living people
Akita Northern Happinets players
American expatriate basketball people in Belgium
American expatriate basketball people in Germany
American expatriate basketball people in Greece
American expatriate basketball people in Japan
American men's basketball players
Apollon Patras B.C. players
Aris B.C. players
Basketball players from Tampa, Florida
Centers (basketball)
Cyberdyne Ibaraki Robots players
Holargos B.C. players
Kangoeroes Basket Mechelen players
Power forwards (basketball)
Rethymno B.C. players
South Florida Bulls men's basketball players
Tigers Tübingen players